Live at the Aragon is a live CD/DVD by the metal band Mastodon. It was released on March 15, 2011. It was filmed on October 17, 2009 during a Mastodon live show in the historic Aragon Ballroom of Chicago, part of their world tour to support their fourth album, Crack the Skye. It features Crack the Skye at its entirety as well as other Mastodon songs from Remission, Leviathan and Blood Mountain, their first, second and third records respectively. To promote the album the band released the live versions of "Oblivion", "Ghost of Karelia" and "Crack the Skye" on YouTube. The DVD also features the Crack the Skye film, which is the album in video format, in its entirety.

Reception

Thom Jurek of Allmusic described the live performance by stating "There is little to no spontaneity or improvisation -- which is neither here nor there -- because what Mastodon do musically is so impressive. All their stop-and-start, fret-ripping, finger-cracking, knotty riffology and technical acumen are on full display."  He also added that "The band's "cleaned up" vocals are disappointing live: neither Brent Hinds, Troy Sanders or Brann Dailor sing on key anywhere here. Given that 'sung vocals' highlighting lyrics are such an important part of the band's M.O. now, this is distracting, almost to a fault."

Track listing

Personnel
 Troy Sanders – bass, vocals
 Brent Hinds – lead guitar, vocals
 Bill Kelliher – rhythm guitar, samples, backing vocals
 Brann Dailor – drums, vocals
 Derek Mitchka - Keyboards on tracks 1-7

Charts

References

Mastodon (band) albums